Margery Chuba-Okadigbo is a Nigerian lawyer and former Senator of the Federal Republic of Nigeria during Goodluck Ebele Jonathan's led government, spouse of the late Chuba Okadigbo who was appointed as Chairman of the board and management of the Nigerian National Petroleum Company Limited by President  Mohammadu Buhari's administration.

Personal life 
Margery lost her husband on September 25, 2003, due to breathing problems, and on May 29th, 2018, she lost a son, Obiajulu Jideofor Okadigbo in a cold-related illness. Margery's eldest  son  Pharaoh Okadigbo died on May 21 2021 in a motor accident. President Muhammadu Buhari through a statement issued by his special adviser on Media and Publicity, Femi Adesina commiserated with the family.

Education 
Margery completed her law degree at the University of Nigeria Nsukka in 1981 and was called to the bar in 1982. To obtain her Master's degree, she attended George Washington University, USA where she specialized in comparative International Law and Negotiations. She also attained professional certificates at  Harvard University, Georgetown University , and the University of Chicago's Booth Business School.

Political Career 
Margery represented Anambra North senatorial District as a Federal Republic of Nigeria senator from 2011- 2015. She spent two years on litigation after the elections; her other contenders in the People's Democratic Party, PDP were Joy Emodi and Stella Oduah.  Margery won and she was sworn in as senator in July 2012.

As the Vice-Chairman Health Committee, Margery played a key role in the healthcare industry through restructuring and co-sponsoring the National Health Bill 2004. she also lobbied for a bipartisan effort to improve the healthcare system in Nigeria. Margery was also a member of the Senate committee on subsidy reinvestment and empowerment program (SURE-P). She focused on strategically reinvesting oil subsidy savings in critical infrastructure and social safety net programs.

Margery's appointment on the board as  Chairman of NNPC is seen as  Ifeanyi Ararume's replacement.

Philanthropy 
Margery established the Chuba Okadigbo Foundation to ensure that her late husband's legacies are sustained for all generations of Nigerians. This foundation consistently offers scholarships, assists widows with credit facilities, picks hospital bills of indigent patients, and secures employment not only for university graduates but for other classes of people as well.

References 

Year of birth missing (living people)
Living people